Meridian is a village in Cayuga County, New York, United States. The population was 309 at the 2010 census. Meridian is near the northern town line of the town of Cato and is west of Syracuse.

History

The community was settled in 1804. It was once called "Cato Four Corners". Meridian was incorporated as a village in 1854.

The Meridian Baptist Church, at the eastern edge of the village, was founded in 1810. The church celebrated the 200th anniversary of its founding for a full year in 2010. The anniversary observance ended in October.

A number of houses and other buildings of spectacular architectural styling, in varying conditions of preservation, grace the village.  If documented, more would certainly be eligible for National Register of Historic Places listing, but as of 2022 only the William Smith Ingham House is so listed.

Notable person
Theodore Ruggles Timby, inventor of the revolving turret used on the USS Monitor during the Civil War, lived in Meridian from at least 1839 until he left in the fall of 1855. Prior to his leaving the village, his fraudulent behavior while serving as Secretary and agent of the Tempest Insurance Company of Meridian caused significant financial losses to the company. He left town heavily in debt. His residence still stands on the west side of Bonta Bridge Road, south of the center of the village.

Geography
Meridian is located at  (43.163531, -76.535045).

New York State Route 370 passes through the village.

Demographics

As of the census of 2000, there were 350 people, 118 households, and 90 families residing in the village. The population density was 505.8 people per square mile (195.8/km2). There were 120 housing units at an average density of 173.4 per square mile (67.1/km2). The racial makeup of the village was 97.43% White, 0.57% Native American, and 2.00% from two or more races. Hispanic or Latino of any race were 1.14% of the population.

There were 118 households, out of which 38.1% had children under the age of 18 living with them, 61.0% were married couples living together, 10.2% had a female householder with no husband present, and 22.9% were non-families. 17.8% of all households were made up of individuals, and 6.8% had someone living alone who was 65 years of age or older. The average household size was 2.97 and the average family size was 3.34.

In the village, the population was spread out, with 31.4% under the age of 18, 8.0% from 18 to 24, 29.1% from 25 to 44, 19.1% from 45 to 64, and 12.3% who were 65 years of age or older. The median age was 34 years. For every 100 females, there were 105.9 males. For every 100 females age 18 and over, there were 96.7 males.

The median income for a household in the village was $41,250, and the median income for a family was $48,250. Males had a median income of $35,313 versus $25,125 for females. The per capita income for the village was $15,567. About 5.5% of families and 9.4% of the population were below the poverty line, including 10.5% of those under age 18 and 5.7% of those age 65 or over.

References

External links

Villages in New York (state)
Populated places established in 1804
Villages in Cayuga County, New York
1804 establishments in New York (state)